is a Japanese professional golfer.

Kawano plays on the Japan Golf Tour, where he has won once.

Professional wins (1)

Japan Golf Tour wins (1)

Japan Golf Tour playoff record (1–1)

External links

Japanese male golfers
Japan Golf Tour golfers
Sportspeople from Tokyo
1981 births
Living people